Jianguomen Station is an interchange station on Line 1 and Line 2 of the Beijing Subway at Jianguomen in Dongcheng District and Chaoyang District, Beijing. The station handles over 170,000 transfers between Lines 1 and 2 per day.

Station layout 
Both the line 1 and 2 stations have underground island platforms.

Exits 
There are three exits, lettered A, B, and C. Exits B and C are accessible.

Around the station
 Office of the Macau Special Administrative Region in Beijing

References

External links
 

Railway stations in China opened in 1984
Beijing Subway stations in Dongcheng District
Beijing Subway stations in Chaoyang District